Agile marketing is an organizational effectiveness strategy that uses self-organizing, cross-functional teams doing work in frequent iterations. It aims to drive growth by focusing team efforts on those that deliver value to the end-customer. This emerging practice in marketing applies selected principles of agile software development. Proponents argue this increases speed, quality, flexibility, and effectiveness of a marketing department. 

At a high-level, agile marketing may be described as a group of teams organizing around the question “How can we best deliver value to our customer?” Teams collaborate across an organization executing a set of high priority tasks over a recurring short (1-4 week) period - adapting direction, objectives, and processes as needed.

Principles 
The core Agile Marketing principles are as follows.

 This is more about responding to changes over following the plan. 
 Focus on working not only documentation
 Focus more on Individuals not only process 
 Focus more on Customer collaboration not the Contract or negotiation

The famous frameworks for the Agile Marketing are Kanban board & Scrum (software development).

See also
Dark marketing

References

Further reading

External links
 Agile Marketing Manifesto. Deliberate echo of the Agile Marketing Training - Online Video Course and its role establishing Agile Software Development.

Marketing techniques